Cychrus solus is a species of ground beetle in the subfamily of Carabinae. It was described by Cavazzuti in 1997.

References

solus
Beetles described in 1997